HSwMS Sjöhunden (Shu), Sw. meaning sea dog, was the fourth ship of the Swedish submarine class Sjöormen, project name A11.

Development 
The planning of the class included a number of different AIP-solutions including nuclear propulsion, however the ships where finally completed with for the time extremely large batteries. The ship was a single hull submarine, with hull shape influenced by the American experimental submarine . The hull was covered with rubber tiles to reduce the acoustic signature (Anechoic tiles), at this time a pioneer technology. The  also pioneered the use of an x-shaped (as opposed to cross-shaped) rudder as a standard (as opposed to experimental) feature.

Service history

The submarine served in the Swedish Navy for almost 30 years and was then sold to Singapore in 1997 together with its four sister ships.

HSwMS Sjöhunden was renamed RSS Chieftain and Singapore acquired the boat on 28 May 1999. She was commissioned into the Republic of Singapore Navy on 26 June 2004 after a major refit. She was in active service as of 2020.

References 

Sjöormen-class submarines
Ships built in Malmö
1968 ships
Challenger-class submarines
Republic of Singapore Navy